is the 20th single by Japanese singer and voice actress Nana Mizuki, which was released on October 28, 2009, by King Records. The single reached number 3 in Japan's Oricon weekly singles charts for the week of November 9, 2009.

Track listing 
 
Lyrics: Nana Mizuki
Composition: Noriyasu Agematsu (Elements Garden)
Arrangement: Junpei Fujita
Second opening theme for the anime television series White Album
 
Lyrics: Hibiki
Composition: Yuusuke Katou
Arrangement: Yuusuke Katou
Opening theme for the anime film Tales of Symphonia the Animation Tethe'alla-hen.
 "Dear Dream"
Lyrics: Shihori
Composition: Shihori
Arrangement: Shinya Saitou, Ipemoto
Ending theme for Card Gakuen
 "Stories"
Lyrics: Leo Kanda, Kazunori Saita
Composition: Yoshihiro Saito
Arrangement: Takahiro Furukawa

Charts

Total Sales : 64,989

References

2009 singles
Nana Mizuki songs
Songs written by Nana Mizuki
Tales (video game series) music
2009 songs
King Records (Japan) singles
Songs with music by Noriyasu Agematsu